Lieutenant-Colonel Charles William Reginald Duncombe, 2nd Earl of Feversham (8 May 1879 – 15 September 1916), known as Viscount Helmsley from 1881 to 1915, was a British Conservative Party politician and soldier.

Origins
Feversham was the son of William Duncombe, Viscount Helmsley, elder son of William Duncombe, 1st Earl of Feversham. His mother was Lady Muriel Frances Louisa, daughter of Charles Chetwynd-Talbot, 19th Earl of Shrewsbury.

He was educated at Eton College and Christ Church, Oxford, gaining a blue in polo with OUPC. He was also a member of Apollo University Lodge

Political career
Lord Helmsley was appointed an assistant private secretary (unpaid) to Lord Selborne, First Lord of the Admiralty, in June 1902. He was elected as the Member of Parliament (MP) for Thirsk and Malton in 1906 and held the seat until he inherited his title on the death of his grandfather in 1915.

Military career and death in action
Lord Helmsley joined the Yorkshire Hussars, and was promoted to Lieutenant on 21 May 1902. He later commanded the regiment.

He enlisted for active service in the First World War. Feversham was killed in action on 15 September 1916 at the Battle of Flers-Courcelette, while commanding 21st Bn (Yeoman Rifles) King's Royal Rifle Corps. The battalion was formed in 1915 at Helmsley. "Dogs were frequent visitors to the trenches and he had taken his deerhound to war: it too was killed and was buried with him" (Tommy by Richard Holmes). This claim was denied in 2014 by a young relative – 'Railways of the Great War, by Michael Portillo. She said that the dog had survived, and was looked after by then Prime Minister (David Lloyd George) who was a great friend of Feversham. He lies in the AIF Burial Ground near the village of Flers on the Somme.

Marriage and children
Lord Feversham married Lady Marjorie Blanche Eva Greville, daughter of Francis Greville, 5th Earl of Warwick, in 1904. They had two sons and one daughter:
Charles Duncombe, 3rd Earl of Feversham, who also became a Conservative politician.
Hon. David, killed in a car accident in 1927, aged only 17.
Lady (Mary) Diana, (1905–1943), married Lt William Greville Worthington (d.1942), RNVR, of Kingston Russell, Dorset. They had issue Capt. Charles William David Worthington (b. 1930) who married as his second wife (he being her second husband) Sara Stucley (b. 1942), youngest daughter of Sir Dennis Stucley, 5th Baronet.
The Dowager Lady Feversham married the Conservative politician Gervase Beckett in 1917. She died in July 1964, aged 79.

Notes

References
Kidd, Charles, Williamson, David (editors). Debrett's Peerage and Baronetage (1990 edition). New York: St Martin's Press, 1990,

External links 

1879 births
1916 deaths
People educated at Eton College
Alumni of Christ Church, Oxford
Earls in the Peerage of the United Kingdom
British Army personnel of World War I
King's Royal Rifle Corps officers
British military personnel killed in the Battle of the Somme
Duncombe, Charles
Duncombe, Charles
Duncombe, Charles
Duncombe, Charles
Feversham, E2
Yorkshire Hussars officers
Charles
Place of birth missing
Burials at the AIF Burial Ground